P'iq'iñ Q'ara Punta (Aymara p'iq'iña head, q'ara bare, bald, p'iq'iña q'ara bald, also spelled Pheken Khara Punta) is a  mountain in the Bolivian Andes. It is located in the Cochabamba Department, Tapacari Province. P'iq'iñ Q'ara Punta lies west of the village of Machaqa Marka (Machacamarca).

References 

Mountains of Cochabamba Department